Danzy is both a surname and a given name. Notable people with the name include:

Theophilus Danzy (1930–2012), American football coach
Danzy Senna (born 1970), American writer

See also
Danny
Danz